Nuestra Belleza Jalisco 2012, will be held at the Teatro Diana in Guadalajara, Jalisco on July 19, 2012. At the conclusion of the final night of competition, Lucia Silva of Puerto Vallarta will crown her successor.

Contestants

References

External links
Official Website
Nuestra Belleza Jalisco

Nuestra Belleza México